The APNG-2 submarine communications cable was constructed to link Papua New Guinea directly to Australia and indirectly to New Zealand and the rest of the world, and has been in service from late 2006.

The new cable is a collaboration between Telikom PNG, Telstra (in Australia), and Telecom New Zealand.

APNG-2 replaced the APNG-1 cable, a coaxial copper cable of 16 Mbit/s, retired in early 2006.

Construction
APNG-2 reused part of the PacRimWest optical fibre cable that formerly linked Australia to Guam and on to Japan.

Recovery and relaying
An 1,800 km section of the PacRimWest cable was recovered from just south of Guam, with the ship sailing towards the Solomon Islands.

The ship then recovered a loop of the PacRimWest cable off Rockhampton, Queensland, broke it, and spliced it to the Sydney end of the recovered 1,800 km section, sailed towards PNG, made landfall at Ela Beach near Port Moresby, where a terminal station from Guam was re-established to link to the Telikom PNG network.

Capability
PacRimWest is a fibre-optic cable with two fibre pairs. These will be used to provide APNG-2 with around 1100 Mbit/s data capability, consisting of 2 x 565 Mbit/s PDH systems with all electronic regeneration.

Cost
The reuse of the cable is expected to save about 80% of the cost of a new cable: USD$11 million v $60 m.

Testing
A 300 km segment of the PacRimWest cable was recovered and tested from a section south of the intended recovery route. It was found to be sound and suitable for reuse.

Cable ship
The cable ship being used is CS Ile de Re (named after the French west coast island, Île de Ré.)

See also
 Communications in Papua New Guinea

External links
 Telikom PNG

Telecommunications in Papua New Guinea
Submarine communications cables in the Pacific Ocean
Australia–Papua New Guinea relations
2006 establishments in Australia
2006 establishments in Papua New Guinea